Indira Gandhi began her second term as Prime Minister of India on 16 March 1971. In her ministry, the ministers were as follows:

Cabinet
Key
  Died in office
  Resigned

Cabinet Ministers

|}

Ministers of State
 Dr. Sarojini Mahishi, Ministry of Tourism and Civil Aviation (1971–74), Ministry of Law, Justice and Company Affairs (1974–76).
 Sushila Rohatgi, Ministry of Finance (1971–77).
 Manorama Pandey, (1972–74).
 Dharam Bir Sinha - Minister of from State Information and Broadcasting

|}

See also

 List of Indian union ministries

Notes

References

Indian union ministries
Indira Gandhi administration
1971 establishments in India
1977 disestablishments in India
Cabinets established in 1971
Cabinets disestablished in 1977